Harry and Jack Williams are sibling British television screenwriters and producers, best known as the creators of the BBC Drama The Missing and its spinoff Baptiste. They are the sons of writer-director Nigel Williams and producer Suzan Harrison.

Career
The Williams started out writing comedy, including Roman’s Empire and Honest. Jack also moonlighted as a script editor, while Harry had some small acting roles. They expanded to drama series, such as Hotel Babylon, Wild at Heart and Call the Midwife. Their animated sitcom Full English, was released in 2012, and other than Fried in 2015, the Williams would shift towards primarily writing thrillers. In 2014, the first series of The Missing, an international co-production between the BBC and Starz, was broadcast. The second series was announced in December that year and production began in February 2016. Subsequently, the character of Julien Baptiste was given his own series. With Tchéky Karyo reprising the role, the programme was broadcast from 2019 to 2021.

The Williams set up the production company Two Brothers Pictures in 2014. It has since developed and produced television projects such as Fleabag, as well as several of the Williams' own projects, such as Liar and Angela Black.

In 2022, their thriller series The Tourist, starring Jamie Dornan as an amnesiac, aired on BBC One. In March 2022, it renewed for a second season.

References

External links
 
 

British television writers
English television writers
English male screenwriters
Screenwriting duos
Living people
Sibling duos
Showrunners
Year of birth missing (living people)